The 1989–90 Iowa State Cyclones men's basketball team represented Iowa State University during the 1989–90 NCAA Division I men's basketball season. The Cyclones were coached by Johnny Orr, who was in his 10th season. They played their home games at Hilton Coliseum in Ames, Iowa.

They finished the season 10–18, 4–10 in Big Eight play to finish in sixth place.  They lost to third-seeded Kansas in the 1990 Big Eight conference tournament quarterfinals.

Games were televised by ESPN, Raycom Sports, and the Cyclone Television Network.

Previous season 
The previous season the Cyclones finished the season 17–12, 7–7 in Big Eight play to finish in a tie for fourth place.  They defeated Oklahoma State in the 1990 Big Eight conference tournament quarterfinals before losing to Oklahoma, 76-74, in the semifinals. They qualified for the NCAA tournament, losing to UCLA in the first round of the Southeast Regional.

Roster

Schedule and results 

|-
!colspan=6 style=""|Exhibition

|-
!colspan=6 style=""|Regular Season

|-

|-

|-

|-

|-

|-

|-

|-
!colspan=6 style=""|Exhibition

|-
!colspan=6 style=""|Regular Season
|-

|-

|-

|-

|-

|-

|-

|-

|-

|-

|-

|-

|-

|-

|-

|-

|-

|-

|-

|-
!colspan=6 style=""|Big Eight tournament
|-

Awards and honors 

All-Big Eight Selections

Victor Alexander (2nd, AP, UPI) 
Terry Woods (HM, AP, UPI) 
Doug Collins (HM, AP, UPI)

Academic All-Big Eight

Phil Kunz

Ralph Olsen Award

Doug Collins
Terry Woods

References 

Iowa State Cyclones men's basketball seasons
Iowa State
Iowa State Cyc
Iowa State Cyc